Alexandru Ilie Răuță (born 17 June 1992) is a Romanian professional footballer who plays as a defensive midfielder for Saudi club Ohod.

He joined Dinamo București in 2019. In 2022, he left Dinamo after the club relegated from the Liga I and signed a two-year contract with Hermannstadt. On 25 January 2023, Răuță  joined Saudi Arabian club Ohod.

Career statistics

Club

Honours

FC Voluntari
 Supercupa României: 2017

References

External links
 
 

1992 births
Living people
Romanian footballers
FC Argeș Pitești players
CS Mioveni players
CS Pandurii Târgu Jiu players
FC Politehnica Iași (2010) players
FC Voluntari players
FC Dinamo București players
FC Hermannstadt players
Ohod Club players
Liga I players
Liga II players
Saudi First Division League players
Association football midfielders
Sportspeople from Pitești
Romanian expatriate footballers
Romanian expatriate sportspeople in Saudi Arabia
Expatriate footballers in Saudi Arabia